In mathematics, a square root of a number  is a number  such that ; in other words, a number  whose square (the result of multiplying the number by itself, or  ⋅ ) is . For example, 4 and −4 are square roots of 16, because .

Every nonnegative real number  has a unique nonnegative square root, called the principal square root, which is denoted by  where the symbol  is called the radical sign or radix. For example, to express the fact that the principal square root of 9 is 3, we write . The term (or number) whose square root is being considered is known as the radicand. The radicand is the number or expression underneath the radical sign, in this case 9.

Although the principal square root of a positive number is only one of its two square roots, the designation "the square root" is often used to refer to the principal square root.

Square roots of negative numbers can be discussed within the framework of complex numbers. More generally, square roots can be considered in any context in which a notion of the "square" of a mathematical object is defined. These include function spaces and square matrices, among other mathematical structures.

History

The Yale Babylonian Collection YBC 7289 clay tablet was created between 1800 BC and 1600 BC, showing  and  respectively as 1;24,51,10 and 0;42,25,35 base 60 numbers on a square crossed by two diagonals. (1;24,51,10) base 60 corresponds to 1.41421296, which is a correct value to 5 decimal points (1.41421356...).

The Rhind Mathematical Papyrus is a copy from 1650 BC of an earlier Berlin Papyrus and other textspossibly the Kahun Papyrusthat shows how the Egyptians extracted square roots by an inverse proportion method.

In Ancient India, the knowledge of theoretical and applied aspects of square and square root was at least as old as the Sulba Sutras, dated around 800–500 BC (possibly much earlier). A method for finding very good approximations to the square roots of 2 and 3 are given in the Baudhayana Sulba Sutra.  Aryabhata, in the Aryabhatiya (section 2.4), has given a method for finding the square root of numbers having many digits.

This is the theorem Euclid X, 9, almost certainly due to Theaetetus dating back to circa 380 BC.
The particular case of the square root of 2 is assumed to date back earlier to the Pythagoreans, and is traditionally attributed to Hippasus. It is exactly the length of the diagonal of a square with side length 1.

In the Chinese mathematical work Writings on Reckoning, written between 202 BC and 186 BC during the early Han Dynasty, the square root is approximated by using an "excess and deficiency" method, which says to "...combine the excess and deficiency as the divisor; (taking) the deficiency numerator multiplied by the excess denominator and the excess numerator times the deficiency denominator, combine them as the dividend."

A symbol for square roots, written as an elaborate R, was invented by Regiomontanus (1436–1476). An R was also used for radix to indicate square roots in Gerolamo Cardano's Ars Magna.

According to historian of mathematics D.E. Smith, Aryabhata's method for finding the square root was first introduced in Europe by Cataneo—in 1546.

According to Jeffrey A. Oaks, Arabs used the letter jīm/ĝīm, the first letter of the word "" (variously transliterated as jaḏr, jiḏr, ǧaḏr or ǧiḏr, "root"), placed in its initial form over a number to indicate its square root. The letter jīm resembles the present square root shape. Its usage goes as far as the end of the twelfth century in the works of the Moroccan mathematician Ibn al-Yasamin.

The symbol "√" for the square root was first used in print in 1525, in Christoph Rudolff's Coss.

Properties and uses

The principal square root function  (usually just referred to as the "square root function") is a function that maps the set of nonnegative real numbers onto itself. In geometrical terms, the square root function maps the area of a square to its side length.

The square root of x is rational if and only if x is a rational number that can be represented as a ratio of two perfect squares. (See square root of 2 for proofs that this is an irrational number, and quadratic irrational for a proof for all non-square natural numbers.) The square root function maps rational numbers into algebraic numbers, the latter being a superset of the rational numbers).

For all real numbers x,

     (see absolute value)

For all nonnegative real numbers x and y,

and

The square root function is continuous for all nonnegative x, and differentiable for all positive x. If f denotes the square root function, whose derivative is given by:

The Taylor series of  about x = 0 converges for  ≤ 1, and is given by

The square root of a nonnegative number is used in the definition of Euclidean norm (and distance), as well as in generalizations such as Hilbert spaces. It defines an important concept of standard deviation used in probability theory and statistics. It has a major use in the formula for roots of a quadratic equation; quadratic fields and rings of quadratic integers, which are based on square roots, are important in algebra and have uses in geometry. Square roots frequently appear in mathematical formulas elsewhere, as well as in many physical laws.

Square roots of positive integers
A positive number has two square roots, one positive, and one negative, which are opposite to each other. When talking of the square root of a positive integer, it is usually the positive square root that is meant.

The square roots of an integer are algebraic integers—more specifically quadratic integers.

The square root of a positive integer is the product of the roots of its prime factors, because the square root of a product is the product of the square roots of the factors. Since   only roots of those primes having an odd power in the factorization are necessary. More precisely, the square root of a prime factorization is

As decimal expansions
The square roots of the perfect squares (e.g., 0, 1, 4, 9, 16) are integers. In all other cases, the square roots of positive integers are irrational numbers, and hence have non-repeating decimals in their decimal representations. Decimal approximations of the square roots of the first few natural numbers are given in the following table.

{|class="wikitable"
!  !!  truncated to 50 decimal places
|- 
|align="right" | 0 || 0
|- 
|align="right" | 1 || 1
|-
|align="right" | 2 || 
|-
|align="right" | 3 || 
|-
|align="right" | 4 || 2
|-
|align="right" | 5 || 
|-
|align="right" | 6 || 
|-
|align="right" | 7 || 
|-
|align="right" | 8 || 
|-
|align="right" | 9 || 3
|-
|align="right" | 10 || 
|-
|}

As expansions in other numeral systems
As with before, the square roots of the perfect squares (e.g., 0, 1, 4, 9, 16) are integers. In all other cases, the square roots of positive integers are irrational numbers, and therefore have non-repeating digits in any standard positional notation system.

The square roots of small integers are used in both the SHA-1 and SHA-2 hash function designs to provide nothing up my sleeve numbers.

As periodic continued fractions
One of the most intriguing results from the study of irrational numbers as continued fractions was obtained by Joseph Louis Lagrange  1780. Lagrange found that the representation of the square root of any non-square positive integer as a continued fraction is periodic. That is, a certain pattern of partial denominators repeats indefinitely in the continued fraction. In a sense these square roots are the very simplest irrational numbers, because they can be represented with a simple repeating pattern of integers.

{|
|- 
|align="right"||| = [1; 2, 2, ...]
|-
|align="right"||| = [1; 1, 2, 1, 2, ...]
|-
|align="right"||| = [2]
|-
|align="right"||| = [2; 4, 4, ...]
|-
|align="right"||| = [2; 2, 4, 2, 4, ...]
|-
|align="right"||| = [2; 1, 1, 1, 4, 1, 1, 1, 4, ...]
|-
|align="right"|||= [2; 1, 4, 1, 4, ...]
|-
|align="right"||| = [3]
|-
|align="right"||| = [3; 6, 6, ...]
|- 
|align="right"||| = [3; 3, 6, 3, 6, ...]
|-
|align="right"||| = [3; 2, 6, 2, 6, ...]
|-
|align="right"||| = [3; 1, 1, 1, 1, 6, 1, 1, 1, 1, 6, ...]
|-
|align="right"||| = [3; 1, 2, 1, 6, 1, 2, 1, 6, ...]
|-
|align="right"||| = [3; 1, 6, 1, 6, ...]
|-
|align="right"||| = [4]
|-
|align="right"||| = [4; 8, 8, ...]
|-
|align="right"||| = [4; 4, 8, 4, 8, ...]
|-
|align="right"||| = [4; 2, 1, 3, 1, 2, 8, 2, 1, 3, 1, 2, 8, ...]
|-
|align="right"||| = [4; 2, 8, 2, 8, ...]
|}

The square bracket notation used above is a short form for a continued fraction. Written in the more suggestive algebraic form, the simple continued fraction for the square root of 11, [3; 3, 6, 3, 6, ...], looks like this:

where the two-digit pattern {3, 6} repeats over and over again in the partial denominators. Since , the above is also identical to the following generalized continued fractions:

Computation

Square roots of positive numbers are not in general rational numbers, and so cannot be written as a terminating or recurring decimal expression. Therefore in general any attempt to compute a square root expressed in decimal form can only yield an approximation, though a sequence of increasingly accurate approximations can be obtained.

Most pocket calculators have a square root key. Computer spreadsheets and other software are also frequently used to calculate square roots. Pocket calculators typically implement efficient routines, such as the Newton's method (frequently with an initial guess of 1), to compute the square root of a positive real number.  When computing square roots with logarithm tables or slide rules, one can exploit the identities

where  and 10 are the natural and base-10 logarithms.

For this technique it is prudent to use the identity

as it allows one to adjust the estimate x by some amount c and measure the square of the adjustment in terms of the original estimate and its square. Furthermore, (x + c)2 ≈ x2 + 2xc when c is close to 0, because the tangent line to the graph of x2 + 2xc + c2 at c = 0, as a function of c alone, is y = 2xc + x2. Thus, small adjustments to x can be planned out by setting 2xc to a, or c = a/(2x).

The most common iterative method of square root calculation by hand is known as the "Babylonian method" or "Heron's method" after the first-century Greek philosopher Heron of Alexandria, who first described it.
The method uses the same iterative scheme as the Newton–Raphson method yields when applied to the function y = f(x) = x2 − a, using the fact that its slope at any point is dy/dx = (x) = 2x, but predates it by many centuries.
The algorithm is to repeat a simple calculation that results in a number closer to the actual square root each time it is repeated with its result as the new input. The motivation is that if x is an overestimate to the square root of a nonnegative real number a then a/x will be an underestimate and so the average of these two numbers is a better approximation than either of them. However, the inequality of arithmetic and geometric means shows this average is always an overestimate of the square root (as noted below), and so it can serve as a new overestimate with which to repeat the process, which converges as a consequence of the successive overestimates and underestimates being closer to each other after each iteration. To find x:

 Start with an arbitrary positive start value x. The closer to the square root of a, the fewer the iterations that will be needed to achieve the desired precision.
 Replace x by the average (x + a/x) / 2 between x and a/x.
 Repeat from step 2, using this average as the new value of x.

If a is positive, the convergence is quadratic, which means that in approaching the limit, the number of correct digits roughly doubles in each next iteration. If , the convergence is only linear.

Using the identity

the computation of the square root of a positive number can be reduced to that of a number in the range . This simplifies finding a start value for the iterative method that is close to the square root, for which a polynomial or piecewise-linear approximation can be used.

The time complexity for computing a square root with n digits of precision is equivalent to that of multiplying two n-digit numbers.

The name of the square root function varies from programming language to programming language, with sqrt (often pronounced "squirt" ) being common, used in C, C++, and derived languages like JavaScript, PHP, and Python.

Square roots of negative and complex numbers

The square of any positive or negative number is positive, and the square of 0 is 0. Therefore, no negative number can have a real square root.  However, it is possible to work with a more inclusive set of numbers, called the complex numbers, that does contain solutions to the square root of a negative number.  This is done by introducing a new number, denoted by i (sometimes by j, especially in the context of electricity where "i" traditionally represents electric current) and called the imaginary unit, which is defined such that . Using this notation, we can think of i as the square root of −1, but we also have  and so −i is also a square root of −1. By convention, the principal square root of −1 is i, or more generally, if x is any nonnegative number, then the principal square root of −x is

The right side (as well as its negative) is indeed a square root of −x, since

For every non-zero complex number z there exist precisely two numbers w such that : the principal square root of z (defined below), and its negative.

Principal square root of a complex number

To find a definition for the square root that allows us to consistently choose a single value, called the principal value, we start by observing that any complex number  can be viewed as a point in the plane,  expressed using Cartesian coordinates. In complex analysis, the location of this point is conventionally written  If

 
The principal square root function is thus defined using the nonpositive real axis as a branch cut.  
It is important that  because if, for example,  (so ) then the principal square root is  but using  would instead produce the other square root  

The principal square root function is holomorphic everywhere except on the set of non-positive real numbers (on strictly negative reals it is not even continuous). The above Taylor series for  remains valid for complex numbers  with 

The above can also be expressed in terms of trigonometric functions:

Algebraic formula

When the number is expressed using its real and imaginary parts, the following formula can be used for the principal square root:

In particular, the imaginary parts of the original number and the principal value of its square root have the same sign. The real part of the principal value of the square root is always nonnegative.

Notes

In the following, the complex z and w may be expressed as:

 
 

Because of the discontinuous nature of the square root function in the complex plane, the following laws are not true in general.

   Counterexample for the principal square root:  and  This equality is valid only when 
 Counterexample for the principal square root:  and  This equality is valid only when 
 Counterexample for the principal square root)This equality is valid only when 

Wrongly assuming one of these laws underlies several faulty "proofs", for instance the following one showing that :

The third equality cannot be justified (see invalid proof). It can be made to hold by changing the meaning of √ so that this no longer represents the principal square root (see above) but selects a branch for the square root that contains  The left-hand side becomes either

if the branch includes +i or

if the branch includes −i, while the right-hand side becomes

where the last equality,  is a consequence of the choice of branch in the redefinition of √.

Nth roots and polynomial roots

Abel–Ruffini theorem states that, in general, the roots of a polynomial of degree five or higher cannot be expressed in terms of th roots.

Square roots of matrices and operators

In general matrices may have multiple square roots or even an infinitude of them. For example, the  identity matrix has an infinity of square roots, though only one of them is positive definite.

In integral domains, including fields
Each element of an integral domain has no more than 2 square roots. The difference of two squares identity  is proved using the commutativity of multiplication. The only square root of 0 in an integral domain is 0 itself.

In a field of characteristic 2, an element either has one square root or does not have any at all, because each element is its own additive inverse, so that . If the field is finite of characteristic 2 then every element has a unique square root. In a field of any other characteristic, any non-zero element either has two square roots, as explained above, or does not have any.

Given an odd prime number , let  for some positive integer . Otherwise, it is a quadratic non-residue. There are  quadratic residues and  quadratic non-residues; zero is not counted in either class. The quadratic residues form a group under multiplication. The properties of quadratic residues are widely used in number theory.

In rings in general
Unlike in an integral domain, a square root in an arbitrary (unital) ring need not be unique up to sign.  For example, in the ring  of integers modulo 8 (which is commutative, but has zero divisors), the element 1 has four distinct square roots: ±1 and ±3.

Another example is provided by the ring of quaternions  which has no zero divisors, but is not commutative. In fact, the set of square roots of −1 is exactly

A square root of 0 is either 0 or a zero divisor. Thus in rings where zero divisors do not exist, it is uniquely 0. However, rings with zero divisors may have multiple square roots of 0.

Geometric construction of the square root

The square root of a positive number is usually defined as the side length of a square with the area equal to the given number.

A square root can be constructed with a compass and straightedge. In his Elements, Euclid (fl. 300 BC) gave the construction of the geometric mean of two quantities in two different places: Proposition II.14 and Proposition VI.13.

The construction is also given by Descartes in his La Géométrie, see figure 2 on page 2. However, Descartes made no claim to originality and his audience would have been quite familiar with Euclid.

Euclid's second proof in Book VI depends on the theory of similar triangles. Construct the circle with AB as diameter and let C be one of the two intersections of the perpendicular chord at H with the circle and denote the length CH as h. Then, using Thales' theorem and, as in the proof of Pythagoras' theorem by similar triangles, triangle AHC is similar to triangle CHB (as indeed both are to triangle ACB, though we don't need that, but it is the essence of the proof of Pythagoras' theorem) so that AH:CH is as HC:HB, i.e. , from which we conclude by cross-multiplication that , and finally that . When marking the midpoint O of the line segment AB and drawing the radius OC of length , then clearly OC > CH, i.e. (with equality if and only if ), which is the arithmetic–geometric mean inequality for two variables and, as noted above, is the basis of the Ancient Greek understanding of "Heron's method".

Constructing successive square roots in this manner yields the Spiral of Theodorus depicted above.

See also
 Apotome (mathematics)
 Cube root
 Functional square root
 Integer square root
 Nested radical
 Nth root
 Root of unity
 Solving quadratic equations with continued fractions
 Square root principle

Notes

References
 
 
 
 
 .

External links

 Algorithms, implementations, and morePaul Hsieh's square roots webpage
 How to manually find a square root
 AMS Featured Column, Galileo's Arithmetic by Tony Philipsincludes a section on how Galileo found square roots

Elementary special functions
Elementary mathematics
Unary operations